The 2014–15 East Midlands Counties Football League season was the 7th in the history of East Midlands Counties Football League, a football competition in England.

League

The league featured 17 clubs from the previous season, along with three new clubs:
Ashby Ivanhoe, promoted from the Leicestershire Senior League
Kimberley Miners Welfare, promoted from the Nottinghamshire Senior League
South Normanton Athletic, promoted from the Central Midlands Football League

League table

References

External links
 East Midlands Counties Football League official site

2014–15
10